Collège royal or variation, may refer to: 

Royal colleges under French or francophone jurisdictions

Educational
Collège royal (Rabat), Morocco; educating royals
Collège de France, Paris, France; (formerly Collège royal) a tertiary school
Collège royal Henry-Le-Grand, La Flèche, Sarthe, France; a military lyceum and tertiary school
Collège militaire royal de Saint-Jean, a Canadian military college

Professional bodies
Collège royal des chirurgiens dentistes du Canada (Canadian Royal College of Dental Surgeons), a professional body

Other uses
 College Royal, an annual event at the Ontario Agricultural College
 College Royal, an annual event at the University of Guelph

See also

 Royal (disambiguation)
 College (disambiguation)
 Royal College (disambiguation)